Corrado Campisi is a professor at the Victor Babeș University of Medicine and Pharmacy, Timișoara in Timișoara, Romania. He is also a member of the European Society of Lymphology and the International Society of Lymphology.

Life
Prof. Corrado is an alumnus of University of Genoa. He attended Surgery of Lymphatic Pathologies and Microsurgery and received two Masters in Reconstructive microsurgery at the Reconstructive Microsurgery European School and in Healthcare and Pharmaceutical Administration at LUISS Rome Business School.

Prof. Corrado served as a surgeon at the San Martino Hospital in Genoa (2009–2014). Then he joined Hospital de la Santa Creu i Sant Pau in Barcelona. In 2015, he joined ICLAS Clinical Institute, GVM Care & Research in Rapallo. Prof. Corrado was a visiting professor of the Breast surgery/plastic surgery division at Columbia University Medical Center in New York (2013). He has participated as a lecturer in the training of nuclear physicians of Columbia University, with particular reference to the best use of Lymphoscintigraphy diagnostics for the study of lymphatic insufficiency of the upper limbs.

Major publications

References

Scientists from Genoa
Living people
21st-century Italian scientists
Articles with ORCID identifiers
1984 births
Academic staff of the Victor Babeș University of Medicine and Pharmacy, Timișoara